Porto Brandão is a locality in the freguesia of Caparica e Trafaria, Almada Municipality, Portugal.  With an excellent strategic location, it is situated by the Tejo river.

Monuments

Edifício do Lazareto, now in ruins.  Until the 1990s, the buildings housed diverse families from the former Portuguese colonies in Africa especially Cape Verde.

Caparica (Almada)